Gbadamosi Agbonjor Jonathan, known as MC Edo Pikin, is a Nigerian comedian. He hails from Ihievbe community of Edo State.In 2021, MC Edo Pikin won The Humour Awards (THA) for the category of Standup Comedian of the Year.

Career 
His older brother, Gbadamasi Bernard Koboko inspired his career as a comedian in 2014.

He is the C.E.O of Every Package Entertainment. His popular comedy show is Edo Pikin Undiluted. He has performed at Voltage-of-hype, Bovi's Naughty by Nature, Supernova Live Concert.

In 2020, he raised awareness about COVID-19.

Personal life 
MC Edo Pikin has a wife, Lily, and two children.

Award and nomination

References

Year of birth missing (living people)
Living people
Place of birth missing (living people)
Nigerian male comedians